= Malandasa =

Town of ancient Cappadocia

Coordinates: 38°12′40″N 34°23′37″E

Malandasa was a town of ancient Cappadocia, inhabited in Byzantine times.

Its site is located near Ovalıbağ, Asiatic Turkey.
